Jhabua Thermal Power Project is a coal based thermal power project located in village Barela – Gorakhpur, in Ghansore tehsil in Seoni district in Indian state of Madhya Pradesh. The power plant is owned by Jhabua Power Limited, a wholly owned subsidiary of Gautam Thapar led Avantha Group.On 5 September 2022 , NTPC acquired the Jhabua power through insolvency process.

BHEL is EPC contractor for this power plant. Coal for the power plant is sourced from South Eastern Coalfields.

Capacity
Its planned capacity is 1260 MW (1x600, 1x660 MW).

References

Coal-fired power stations in Madhya Pradesh
Seoni district
2016 establishments in Madhya Pradesh
Energy infrastructure completed in 2016